Dominic Christopher Sandbrook (born 2 October 1974) is a British historian, author, columnist and television presenter.

Early life and career
Born in Bridgnorth, Shropshire, he was educated at Malvern College and studied history and French at Balliol College, Oxford. He then studied for a master's degree in history at the University of St Andrews and a PhD at Jesus College, Cambridge.

Previously a lecturer in history at the University of Sheffield, he has been a senior fellow of the Rothermere American Institute at Oxford University and a member of its history faculty. Sandbrook was a visiting professor at King's College London, and a freelance writer and newspaper columnist. In 2007 he was named one of Waterstone's 25 Authors for the Future.

Authorship 
Sandbrook's first book, a biography of the US politician and presidential candidate Eugene McCarthy, proved extremely controversial on its publication in the United States in 2004. Writing for H-Net, the interdisciplinary forum for scholars in the humanities and social sciences, David Stebenne said the book "describes McCarthy's life and work with outstanding grace and clarity", and was "a very fine study of a significant figure that serious students of American postwar history will want to consult." McCarthy himself called the book "almost libellous".

In 2005, Sandbrook published Never Had It So Good, a history of Britain from the Suez Crisis to The Beatles, 1956–63. It was described as a "rich treasure chest of a book" by Anthony Howard in The Daily Telegraph, who wrote of his "respect for the sweep and scope of the author's knowledge". Nick Cohen wrote in The Observer that it was "a tribute to Sandbrook's literary skill that his scholarship is never oppressive. Alternately delightful and enlightening, he has produced a book which must have been an enormous labour to write but is a treat to read".

The sequel, White Heat, covering the years 1964–70 and the rise and fall of Harold Wilson's Labour government, was published in August 2006. "Sandbrook's book could hardly be more impressive in its scope", wrote Leo McKinstry in The Times. "He writes with authority and an eye for telling detail." In November 2009, it was named by the Telegraph as "one of the books that defined the Noughties".

Unlike some previous historians of the 1960s, Sandbrook argues that the period was marked by strong conservatism and conformity. His books attempt to debunk what he sees as myths associated with the period, from the sexual revolution to student protest, and he challenges the "cultural revolution" thesis associated with historians like Arthur Marwick. Charles Shaar Murray, writing in The Independent, called Sandbrook "the Hoodie Historian" and imagined him "slouching into shot while throwing whatever passes for gang signs in the history department of the University of Sheffield, and announcing to Arthur Marwick, Jonathon Green et al. that 'You is all mi bitches nuh.'"

Sandbrook continued the history of postwar Britain with State of Emergency (2010), covering the period 1970–1974, and Seasons in the Sun, which took the story up to the election of Margaret Thatcher as prime minister in 1979. A fifth volume, Who Dares Wins, covering the period 1979–1982, was published in October 2019. Anthony Quinn, reviewing for The Observer, described it as a "long, painstaking and pretty enjoyable haul through Britain in the first three years of the Thatcher government ... ungratifyingly even-handed in his portrait of [Thatcher], alive to the flaws in her character and sharp in confounding the popular myths." For The Sunday Times, Piers Brendon said it was "a rich mixture of political narrative and social reportage ... scholarly, accessible, well written, witty and incisive."

Sandbrook has written articles and reviews for the Daily Mail, The Sunday Times, The Sunday Telegraph, The Observer and The Daily Telegraph and has appeared on BBC radio and television. His Radio Four series SlapDash Britain, charting the rise and fall of British governance since the Second World War, was described by the radio critic Miranda Sawyer as "very brilliant".

Apparent plagiarism
In February 2011, Michael C. Moynihan identified several instances of apparent plagiarism in Sandbrook's book Mad as Hell. Moynihan later expressed amazement that there were few repercussions for Sandbrook's career. He suggested that Sandbrook was shielded from criticism by his social connections, saying: "There is an element of protection. Media buddies who go to the same dinner parties and all the rest of it."

In an interview with Brendan O'Neill, Sandbrook rejected the allegations and maintained that he "footnoted his sources, and if popular history books sometimes sound familiar that is because there are only so many ways to say things."

Television and radio

Podcast

Sandbrook presents a podcast with historian Tom Holland, called The Rest is History.

Bibliography

References

External links
 
 The Rest is History podcast
 

1974 births
Academics of the University of Sheffield
Alumni of Balliol College, Oxford
Alumni of Jesus College, Cambridge
Alumni of the University of St Andrews
BBC television presenters
English historians
British Jews
English television presenters
Historians of the United Kingdom
Living people
People educated at Malvern College
People from Bridgnorth
Television personalities from Shropshire
English podcasters